Princess Prekshya Rajya Lakshmi Devi Shah of Nepal (19 January 1952 – 12 November 2001) was a princess consort of Nepal who died in a helicopter accident in Rara Lake along with three other passengers.

Life

Princess Prekshya was the younger sister of Queen Aishwarya of Nepal and Queen Komal of Nepal. She was educated at St Mary's School, Jawalakhel; St Helen's Convent, Kurseong; and Tribhuvan University.

Princess Prekshya married her second cousin Prince Dhirendra, a brother of King Birendra at Kathmandu, on 13 February 1972. Prekshya and Dhirendra had three daughters:

 Princess Puja Rajya Lakshmi Devi Shah of Nepal (born 1977), married Captain Dr Rajiv Raj Shahi in 1998. She had children;
 Princess Dilasha Rajya Lakshmi Devi Shah of Nepal (born 1979), married in 2003 Adarsha Bikram Rana. She had children;
 Princess Sitashma Rajya Lakshmi Devi Shah of Nepal (born 1981), married Abinesh Shah in 2003. She had children.

Princess Prekshya did not get along with her husband. She and Dhirendra separated when he renounced the style of Royal Highness, which Prekshya did not. They did not divorce, but Dhirendra went to live in London with an English woman who became his partner.

Dhirendra was killed in the Nepalese royal massacre on 1 June 2001; Princess Prekshya did not attend the event due to back problems. She died on 12 November 2001, in a helicopter crash: she was returning to Nepal on the helicopter when suddenly, right under Lake Rara, the helicopter crashed; her lifeless body was found in the waters of the lake. She was only 49 years old. Her body was later transported to Kathmandu for cremation. After the death of the Princess, the Prime Minister Pushpa Kamal Dahal declared that there was a bond between the royal massacre and the death of Prekshya.

Patronages
 Member of Raj Sabha (The King's Council) (1977).
 Co-Chief of the Scout Movement of Nepal (1975).

Styles
 Lady Prekshya Rajya Lakshmi Devi (1952–1972).
 HRH Princess Prekshya Rajya Lakshmi Devi Shah of Nepal (1972–2001).

Honours

National honours
 Member of the Order of the Gurkha Right Hand, 1st class (1975).
 Member of the Order of the Three Divine Powers, 1st class (23 October 2001).
 King Birendra Investiture Medal (24 February 1975).

Foreign honours
 Honorary Dame Grand Cross of the Royal Victorian Order (GCVO, 17 February 1986).

References

1953 births
2001 deaths
Nepalese princesses
Members of the Order of Tri Shakti Patta, First Class
Members of the Order of Gorkha Dakshina Bahu, First Class
Honorary Dames Grand Cross of the Royal Victorian Order
Victims of aviation accidents or incidents in Nepal
20th-century Nepalese nobility